Stansted Mountfitchet Castle, also termed simply  Mountfitchet Castle, is a Norman ringwork and bailey fortification in Stansted Mountfitchet, Essex, England. The site is currently in use as a Living history museum.

History 

The castle was built following the Norman Conquest of England by the Montfitchet family. Within the ringwork was a keep, within a small, round enclosure.

It is believed to have been an early Iron Age fort and Roman, Saxon and Viking settlement. Artefacts found on the site from these periods support this belief.
In 1066 the site was attacked by the Normans and Robert Gernon built his castle here, making it his chief seat and the head of his Barony. Robert Gernon (or Robert Greno as he is referred to in the Domesday Book of 1086) came over from France with William the Conqueror, and was rewarded with this lordship and several others in the county. The male line of the Gernon family continued for only five generations.

Conservation
Mountfitchet Castle is a scheduled monument. In the 1980s the castle was reconstructed as a tourist attraction. The grounds were cleared to reveal the original earthworks and mounds and after years of battling with planners, in 1980 the work began to reconstruct Mountfitchet Castle. After many years of work the restoration of Mountfitchet Castle was complete, and it was opened to the public in 1985. It is unique in being the only wooden Motte and Bailey reconstruction on its original site anywhere in the world.

Livestock
The castle is the home of livestock, that would have been kept by people during the period when the castle was in use.
In 2013, one of the castle's cockerels, a Light Brahma named 'Little John', was nominated for the world record for tallest chicken, standing at 66 centimetres tall.

See also
Castles in Great Britain and Ireland
List of castles in England

References

Bibliography

 
 

Ringwork castles
Castles in Essex
Motte-and-bailey castles
Scheduled monuments in Essex
Stansted Mountfitchet